Premier is a symbol group in the United Kingdom established in 1994, with over 3,000 stores nationwide. Tesco took ownership of the brand in 2018 after its purchase of Booker Group.

Premier stores are generally convenience shops, stocking branded and own brand products, such as Euro Shopper and Happy Shopper.

Some Premier stores include a Post Office branch.

References

External links

Tesco
Convenience stores of the United Kingdom
Privately held companies of the United Kingdom
Supermarkets of the United Kingdom
Retail companies of the United Kingdom
Retail companies of Scotland
Retail companies established in 1994
British companies established in 1994